Dale Anthony Dawson (November 2, 1964 – May 25, 2018) was an American football player who played as a placekicker in the National Football League (NFL) for the Minnesota Vikings, Philadelphia Eagles and Green Bay Packers.

Biography
Dawson was born in Moultrie, Georgia, and attended Eastern Kentucky University.

Dawson spent the 1987 NFL season with the Minnesota Vikings. He split the following season between the Philadelphia Eagles and the Green Bay Packers. He would be the last Packer to wear #4 before the arrival of Brett Favre.

He died on May 25, 2018, at the age of 53.

References

1964 births
Living people
Sportspeople from West Palm Beach, Florida
Minnesota Vikings players
Philadelphia Eagles players
Green Bay Packers players
American football placekickers
Eastern Kentucky Colonels football players
Players of American football from Florida
National Football League replacement players